The term Harmon award may refer to:
 Any of several awards created and administered by the William E. Harmon Foundation, including:
 The William E. Harmon Foundation award for distinguished achievement among Negroes, awarded (1926–30).
 The Harmon Foundation scholarship award, in conjunction with the Eagle Scout (Boy Scouts of America).
 The Harmon Trophy, a set of three international trophies in aeronautics.
 The Bill Harmon award, an advertising award of the Chicago Magazine Association
 The George O. Harmon Award, an award of the customer services industry presented by the Association for Services Management  International